Splendrillia abdita is a species of sea snail, a marine gastropod mollusk in the family Drilliidae.

Description
The length of the shell attains 10 mm.

Distribution
This species occurs in the Caribbean Sea off Barbados.

References

 Fallon P.J. (2016). Taxonomic review of tropical western Atlantic shallow water Drilliidae (Mollusca: Gastropoda: Conoidea) including descriptions of 100 new species. Zootaxa. 4090(1): 1–363

External links
 

abdita
Gastropods described in 2016